Alaina Bergsma (born March 30, 1990) is an American volleyball player. She was on the United States women's national volleyball team.

Career
During her college career, Bergsma won the 2009 All-West Coast Conference Team and Freshman of the Year, 2010 All-Pac-10 Honorable Mention, 2011 AVCA Third-Team All-American, 2011 All-Pac-12/Region First Team and during the 2012 season, the AVCA National Player of the Year, Pac-12 Player of the Year, AVCA First-Team All-American, All-Pac-12/Region First Team and the Capital One Third-Team Academic All-American.

While at Oregon, she won the Honda Sports Award as the nation's best collegiate female volleyball player in 2013.

Bergsma won the 2014 Philippine Superliga Grand Prix Finals Most Valuable Player award and the Superliga crown.

She joined the Korean V-League club Daejeon KGC for the 2016/17 season. and helped Daejeon to the silver medal in the Korean Cup. She scored 55 points in the Korean League second semifinal match against IBK Altos, scoring 50 points in attack and 5 blocks, tying as the third major total points ever recorded. Her team lost the semifinal 2-3 to IBK and settled with the bronze medal. In May 2017 she renewed her contract with Daejeon.

Personal
Bergsma went to University of Oregon and studied sports business. In 2012, she won the Miss Oregon USA pageant and represented Oregon in Miss USA 2012, she did not place and was awarded Miss Photogenic.

Clubs
  Mets de Guaynabo (2013)
  Minas Tênis Clube (2013–2014)
  Petron Blaze Spikers (2014–2015)
  Gigantes de Carolina (2015)
  Supreme Chonburi (2015)
  Yunnan Volleyball (2015-2016)
  Gresik Petrokimia (2016) 
  Daejeon KGC (2016–present)

Awards

College
 2009 All-West Coast Conference Team
 2009 WCC Freshman of the Year
 2010 All-Pac-10 Honorable Mention
 2011 AVCA Third-Team All-American
 2012 AVCA National Player of the Year
 2012 Pac-12 Player of the Year
 2012 AVCA First-Team All-American
 2012 Capital One Third-Team Academic All-American
2013 Honda Sports Award for volleyball

Individuals
 2014 Philippine Superliga Grand Prix "Finals Most Valuable Player"
 2016/17 Korean V-League "Best Opposite"
 2016/17 Korean V-League "All-Star Game Most Valuable Player"

Clubs
 2014 Philippine Superliga Grand Prix –  Champion, with Petron Blaze Spikers
 2016 Korean Cup –  Runner-Up, with Daejeon KGC
 2016/17 Korean V-League –  Bronze medal, with Daejeon KGC

References

External links 
 

1990 births
Living people
American beauty pageant winners
American women's volleyball players
Beauty pageant contestants from Oregon
Miss USA 2012 delegates
Oregon Ducks women's volleyball players
Sportspeople from Chandler, Arizona
Opposite hitters
Expatriate volleyball players in Brazil
Expatriate volleyball players in the Philippines
Expatriate volleyball players in Thailand
Expatriate volleyball players in China
Expatriate volleyball players in Indonesia
Expatriate volleyball players in South Korea
American expatriate sportspeople in South Korea
American expatriate sportspeople in Brazil
American expatriate sportspeople in Thailand
American expatriate sportspeople in China
American expatriate sportspeople in Indonesia
American expatriate sportspeople in the Philippines
Loyola Marymount Lions women's volleyball players